Vendar is a village in Kottarakara taluk, Kollam district, Kerala, India. It has many educational institutions and many temples, including Major Sree Subrahmanya swamy Temple and Katiravan Kunnu Sree Balasubrahmanya Swamy Temple Madathikal Devi Temple

References

Villages in Kollam district